Charles Anton Berti, Jr.  (born June 21, 1972, in Rock Springs, Wyoming) is a former professional American football player who played offensive lineman for four seasons for the San Diego Chargers. Starting at guard and tackle in 1996 and 1997, Tony was an integral member of the Chargers' offensive line. A shoulder injury during training camp in 1998, put Tony on the IR list for most of the season. With a significant number of starters injured and limited maneuverability under the salary cap, the Chargers reluctantly traded Tony to the play-off bound Seattle Seahawks with only five weeks remaining in the season. In 1999, Tony was one of only two free-agents signed by the two-time Super Bowl champion Denver Broncos. However, another shoulder injury and subsequent surgery during training camp sidelined him again for the 1999 season. Tony signed with the Green Bay Packers in 2000. Days into training camp he abruptly announced his retirement.

In 2001, joining former teammates San Diego Charger Kurt Gouveia and Denver Bronco David Diaz-Infante, Tony was named the starting right tackle for the start-up XFL's Las Vegas Outlaws.

References

External links
Tony Berti career statistics NFL.com; retrieved 15 April 2011
NFL.com; retrieved 7 October 2012

1972 births
Living people
Players of American football from Wyoming
American football offensive guards
American football offensive tackles
Colorado Buffaloes football players
San Diego Chargers players
People from Rock Springs, Wyoming
Las Vegas Outlaws (XFL) players
People from Thornton, Colorado